The Pennsylvania Railroad's class J28 comprised two experimental 2-6-2 "Prairie" type steam locomotives.

History
In 1905, the Pennsylvania Railroad needed a better steam locomotive, than the class E 4-4-2 "Atlantic" type. So, the railroad ordered two 2-6-2s from Alco-Schenectady. They were tested extensively and failed in railroad service. However, they were still on the roster in the late 1920s.

Specifications
The two J28s had 80 inch drivers and a 34.25 foot engine wheelbase. Engine #7453 had inboard piston valves and Stephenson valve gear, while #2761 had outside piston valves and Walschaerts valve gear. They each weighed 377,500 pounds with the tender. Despite these specifications and more, the J28 was not a powerful enough Pennsylvania Railroad locomotive.

J28
Experimental locomotives
2-6-2 locomotives
Steam locomotives of the United States
Scrapped locomotives
Standard gauge locomotives of the United States